The 1993 ITU Triathlon World Championships were held in Manchester, United Kingdom on August 21 and August 22, 1993.

Results

Men's Championship

Women's Championship

See also
1993 ITU Triathlon World Cup

References
 Results, men elite
 Results, women elite
 Results, junior men
 Results, junior women

World Triathlon Series
World Championships
Triathlon World Championships
Triathlon competitions in the United Kingdom
International sports competitions in Manchester